, also known by his Chinese style name , was a bureaucrat of the Ryukyu Kingdom. Gusukuma was also a famous calligrapher, he imitated the handwriting of Prince Son'en, a princely priest and calligrapher of Japan during Kamakura period very well, so he got the nick name .

Gusukuma was born to an aristocrat family called Ō-uji Nagayama Dunchi. He was the eldest son of Kunigami Seijun. He was pro-Japanese, and was elected a member of Sanshikan in 1601, but was accused by his political opponent Jana Ueekata and removed from his position in 1605. He lost his official position and peerage, but his hereditary fief remained. He was not restored until 1610.

When Satsuma invaded Ryukyu in the spring of 1609, Gusukuma's eldest son, Gusukuma Sapeechin Seizō, joined the army led by Goeku Ueekata which tried to block Satsuma troops at the Taihei bridge. Seizō was shot by a hinawajū (or arquebus) and decapitated. Ryukyuan soldiers were shocked and fled.

After King Shō Nei's surrender, Gusukuma was taken to Kagoshima together with the king and a number of high officials by Satsuma troops. He regained his peerage in 1610, and returned to Ryukyu together with the king in 1611. He died in the next year.

References

1542 births
1612 deaths
16th-century calligraphers
16th-century Ryukyuan people
17th-century calligraphers
17th-century Ryukyuan people
People of the Ryukyu Kingdom
Ryukyuan people
Sanshikan
Ueekata